Allison Beth Raskin (born June 20, 1989) is an American writer, director, comedian, YouTuber, podcaster, and mental health advocate. She previously worked as a writer at BuzzFeed Video, but left in 2015 with fellow writer and friend Gabe Dunn to pursue work on their comedy YouTube channel, "Just Between Us."

Raskin has written for Elle, NBC News Think, and Splinter News. On September 5, 2017, she and Dunn released a joint novel, I Hate Everyone but You, which reached the top ten on The New York Times best sellers list.

Early life and education 
Raskin was born on June 20, 1989 in Manhattan, New York to a Jewish family. She attended the University of Southern California and received a Bachelor’s of Fine Arts degree. In 2020, she began a clinical psychology program with an emphasis in Marriage and Family Therapy at Pepperdine University.

Raskin is outspoken about her struggles with mental health. When she was 4 years old she was diagnosed with obsessive–compulsive disorder (OCD), and continued to experience anxiety and depression. She took medication until she was 21, then took a seven-year break, which included therapy. When she was 28 she went back on medication and experienced backlash regarding weight gain due to side effects.

Career

BuzzFeed 
Raskin was a writer at BuzzFeed video where she was featured in a number of videos, both by herself and with Dunn. She and Dunn left in 2015 to commit to the JBU YouTube channel. They cited the difficulties of working with Buzzfeed, who wanted to limit their time on JBU. They stated it was the scariest decision they'd had to make.

Just Between Us 
Raskin and Dunn co-created the "Just Between Us" YouTube channel in 2014. A self-described odd couple, they play versions of themselves in sketch comedy videos and discuss relevant topics such as mental health, friendships, and relationships in their show of the same name, Just Between Us. They also started a podcast under the same name in March 2019, where they have guests discuss topics and answer prompts. This includes a section entitled "Hypotheticals", where Raskin asks Dunn and guests questions such as, "Would you stay with this cheater?"

Gossip 
With the help of Stitcher, Raskin created Gossip, a 12-episode scripted podcast, which chronicles three female friends as they meet each week to discuss gossip surrounding their suburban town. The podcast ran from June 2018 to August 2018.

Books 
Raskin's first novel, I Hate Everyone But You, co-written with Gabe Dunn, was published on September 5, 2017. The sequel, Please Send Help, was released on July 16, 2019.

References

External links 
 "Just Between Us" on YouTube

1989 births
Living people
American writers
University of Southern California alumni
American directors
American women comedians
Writers from Manhattan
BuzzFeed people
Jewish American female comedians
Jewish American writers
American YouTubers
21st-century American Jews
21st-century American women